Prawno  is a village in the administrative district of Gmina Józefów nad Wisłą, within Opole Lubelskie County, Lublin Voivodeship, in eastern Poland.

This is a small and picturesque agricultural village along the Wyznica River.  The village's name means "right" or "correct", and is derived from the Polish word for law or right, "prawo". The village's church, the Roman Catholic Parish of St Anne serves many of the nearby villages (e.g., Mazanów, Mariampol, Boiska, Pielgrzymka, Chuślanki, Miloszówka, Stasin, Graniczna, Pokreśle) and there is a cemetery for Prawno and the communities served by the parish across the main road from the Prawno church.  The parish website provides a map showing the villages that it serves, and has many photographs of parish life and the area of Prawno.

The village has a population of 180.

References

External links
Roman Catholic Parish of St Anne

Prawno